Anna Maria Uusitalo (née Anna Maria Nilsson, born 13 May 1983 in Östersund, Sweden)

is a Swedish former biathlete. She represented Sweden at the 2010 Winter Olympics in Vancouver. On 24 April 2012 Uusitalo officially announced her retirement from biathlon.

References

External links

Swedish female biathletes
Olympic biathletes of Sweden
Biathletes at the 2010 Winter Olympics
Living people

1983 births
People from Östersund